Yashas Shetty is an Indian contemporary artist.  He is most well known for his work with (Art)ScienceBLR and the Indian Sonic Research Organization (ISRO).  In 2009 he founded Hackteria, with the artists Andy Gracie and the biohacker Marc Dusseiller while all three were in residence at Medialab-Prado in Madrid.
 
He is a faculty member of the Srishti Institute of Art Design and Technology and a founding member of the Center for Experimental Media Art (CEMA). His students have successfully constructed low cost innovation products  microscope from Web cam, a low speed centrifuge from egg beater and low cost incubator designed from cardboard and have won awards at the International Genetically Engineered Machine (IGEM) competition. He is also a host at the Bangalore station of Radio Quarantine.

References

External links 
 Official Hackteria website
 Official Indian Sonic Research Organization website
 Official (Art)ScienceBLR website

New media artists
BioArtists
International artist groups and collectives
Indian contemporary artists
Year of birth missing (living people)
Living people